Blauvelt is a hamlet and census-designated place, formerly known as Greenbush and then Blauveltville, in the town of Orangetown, Rockland County, New York, United States. It is located north of Tappan, east of Nauraushaun and Pearl River, south of Central Nyack, and west of Orangeburg. As of the 2010 census, the CDP had a population of 5,689.

Geography
Blauvelt is located at  (41.064396, -73.956881).

Demographics

As of the census of 2000, there were 5,207 people, 1,564 households, and 1,313 families residing in the CDP. The population density was 1,144.4 per square mile (441.9/km2). There were 1,588 housing units at an average density of 349.0/sq mi (134.8/km2). The racial makeup of the CDP was 88.42% White, 1.56% African American, 0.02% Native American, 7.34% Asian, 1.44% from other races, and 1.23% from two or more races. Hispanic or Latino of any race were 5.93% of the population.

There were 1,564 households, out of which 38.7% had children under the age of 18 living with them, 71.9% were married couples living together, 8.8% had a female householder with no husband present, and 16.0% were non-families. 13.6% of all households were made up of individuals, and 8.2% had someone living alone who was 65 years of age or older. The average household size was 3.08 and the average family size was 3.40.

In the CDP, the population was spread out, with 25.6% under the age of 18, 9.8% from 18 to 24, 25.9% from 25 to 44, 22.2% from 45 to 64, and 16.6% who were 65 years of age or older. The median age was 38 years. For every 100 females, there were 90.4 males. For every 100 females age 18 and over, there were 88.7 males.

The median income for a household in the CDP was $103,071, and the median income for a family was $104,944. Males had a median income of $90,125 versus $80,096 for females. The per capita income for the CDP was $94,211. About 1.9% of families and 3.5% of the population were below the poverty line, including 2.1% of those under age 18 and 11.5% of those age 65 or over.

History

The name "Blauvelt", of Dutch origin, is that of a prominent family that settled in the area in the 17th century.  The etymology of the name probably comes from the coat of arms adopted by the first Blauvelt, Pieter Blauwveld, a prominent trader in the Netherlands. Literally, it means "blue-field", or "blue pasture fields", likely a reference to the blue and yellow shields hung on Pieter's ships (a common 14th century Dutch method of identifying the owner). The first Blauvelt in America was a peasant farmer who cultivated tobacco on the estate of Kiliaen van Rensselaer, the first patroon of the Manor of Rensselaerswyck near Albany, New York,  in 1638.

In 1909, New York State purchased property in Blauvelt to create Camp Bluefields, a large rifle range used to train members of the New York National Guard prior to World War I. The property was later used by the YWCA, ROTC, Columbia University and the U.S. Army for various purposes before being abandoned following World War II. The land is today the site of Blauvelt State Park.

In 1972, Robert Salvia and Professor Dr. Paul Olson of the Lamont–Doherty Earth Observatory, a research unit of Columbia University located on a  campus in Palisades, New York, discovered several 200-million-year-old dinosaur tracks that were identified as being from the coelophysis. Some of these tracks were sent to the New York State Museum in Albany, New York for identification and preservation. The fossils date from the Triassic period and are claimed to be the only dinosaur tracks ever discovered in the state of New York.

The 914 Sound Studios was a musical recording studio in the 1970s.  Several albums were recorded in Blauvelt, including the title track of Bruce Springsteen's album Born to Run in 1974.

Tourism

Historical markers

The Jacob J. Blauvelt house and its four remaining acres of land had been in the Blauvelt family since the time it was built, in 1832, up until when it was acquired by the Historical Society of Rockland County in 1970. The Blauvelt family first arrived in America in 1638, and first arrived in Rockland County in 1683. Their genealogy today contains more than 26,000 names.
 Johannes J. Blauvelt - 514 Western Highway - Jacob A. Blauvelt and family, the first of seven generations of Blauvelts to live on this farm, occupied a log structure nearby early in the 18th century. Jacob's son, Johannes J. Blauvelt, built the sandstone south wing of the home ca. 1755. The center section was added after the Revolutionary War, and the north wing ca. 1862. This house was used as an officers' club during World War II.
 Jacob J. Blauvelt (1757–1834)  - 525 Western Highway
 Johannes Isaac Blauvelt - 820 Western Highway - Johannes (1743–1828) was a charter member of the Greenbush Church. His son David began Rockland County's first tobacco farm and business there. Abraham M. Blauvelt (gunsmith) repaired guns and watches here and rented boats on the Hackensack River in the rear. The Blauvelt family occupied these premises for 135 years. The Dutch farmhouse is located on the northwest corner of the Tappen Patent and contains many original construction features.

 Blauvelt-Norris-Burr House - 608 Western Highway - The main section and south kitchen of this Dutch home were built ca. 1790-1800, the north addition ca. 1840, on land previously owned by David Bogert. The first known occupant was Garret I. Blauvelt. In 1853 the farm was acquired by John S. Norris, an architect and builder. In 1885 it was purchased by the Burr family who owned it for 56 years. The current owner of the house did a great deal of restoration in 2008/09. In the course of removing 1960's changes and opening walls to correct structural damages, a different scenario for the house has emerged. There is evidence of a door and a window suggesting the south kitchen was added later than previously thought. The south chimney of the main section of the house differs from the north, in that it contains three fireplaces off a center chimney, suggesting it is the remnant of a previous building. In checking with the Historical Society, there are two maps of early Rockland County homesteads — the earlier one dated 1750. The Blauvelt-Norris-Burr House appears on that map suggesting it was built before 1750. Also, the house is larger than most in the area, and the construction of the upper floor suggests it is not as old as the bottom. Photographs from the later part of the 1800s show the addition of a front porch, which explains the unusually large section of clapboard between the stone foundation and roof. The owner feels a reasonable chronology is thus: The house that predates the 1750 map was torn down and rebuilt (possibly) in 1790, as the Society states. There is no evidence that the so-called "south kitchen" was a kitchen, because the room was structurally altered in the early 20th century (early plaster board suggests this), and there is no evidence of a large cooking fireplace. At one point the main south chimney did have a large kitchen fireplace, as did the north wing which was added later using "recycled" hand-honed beams that may have come from the pre-1750 house. This stone addition seems to have replaced another, possibly of wood and half its present size, as the interior wall of the main building is partially whitewashed. Again, this suggests that the north wing was an addition. The upper floor was most certainly added to the house in the 19th century. Possibly the architect Norris did this after he purchased it because he was the most capable. (He had also recently married a woman with two daughters, and this would have given him plenty of room.) Raising the roof would explain the absence of plaster behind the wainscoting upstairs, floor seams that suggest a different wall configuration at one point, the unusually high window dormers which can only reasonably have been added at the time of the roof raising and porch addition, the clapboard between the stone and roof, and the high ceilings which contain milled beams on the main floor.

Landmarks and places of interest
 Greenbush Presbyterian Church - Western Highway - In October 1812, ten founders, nine of whom were Blauvelts, held their first organizational meeting for this new church. The first stone church was dedicated in 1824. It was destroyed by fire in 1835. A second church built on the old walls was dedicated in 1837. It burned in 1882. The present church, in the Gothic style, was dedicated in 1883, with the tower and bell erected in 1896. Many Blauvelts are buried in the cemetery

Notable people
Conrad Hoffmann Jr., Christian missionary, died in Blauvelt
Amos Pollard, a defender of the Alamo

References

External links

 Historical Markers and War Memorials in Blauvelt, New York
 Blauvelt Volunteer Fire Company
 Historical Blauvelt Homes and Places
 The Dinosaurs and Prehistoric Animals of New York

Census-designated places in New York (state)
Hamlets in New York (state)
Census-designated places in Rockland County, New York
Hamlets in Rockland County, New York